Aleksandar Pantić (Serbian Cyrillic: Александар Пантић; born 11 April 1992) is a Serbian professional footballer who plays as a centre-back for Spanish club CD Lugo.

Club career

Rad
He made his professional debut for Rad on 29 May 2011, in Serbian SuperLiga match versus Javor Ivanjica.

Red Star Belgrade
In the final hours of 2012 summer transfer window, on 31 August 2012, Pantić signed a one-year contract for Serbian powerhouse Red Star Belgrade. He appeared in 13 matches during his only campaign and also scoring his first professional goal, in a 7–2 home routing over BSK Borča.

Villarreal
On 7 July 2013 Pantić signed a three-year deal with La Liga side Villarreal CF. He made his debut in the competition on 6 January of the following year, coming on as a second-half substitute in a 5–2 routing at Rayo Vallecano.

On 1 August 2014 Pantić joined fellow league team Córdoba CF in a season-long loan. On 20 August of the following year he moved to SD Eibar also in the top division, on loan for one year.

On 4 August 2016, Pantić was again loaned to another club in the Spanish top tier, Deportivo Alavés.

Dynamo Kyiv
On 1 February 2017, Pantić signed for Ukrainian club FC Dynamo Kyiv. On 30 January 2019, he returned to Spain after agreeing to a six-month loan deal with Cádiz CF in Segunda División.

On 2 September 2019, Dynamo Kyiv and Pantić mutually agreed to terminate his contract, making him a free agent.

Doxa Katokopias
On 6 August 2020, after nearly one year without a club, Pantić joined Doxa Katokopias FC in Cyprus. He was loaned to fellow league team AEL Limassol the following 2 February, before returning to his parent club in June.

Pantić left Doxa on 30 August 2021.

Zagłębie Lubin
On 23 September 2021, Pantić switched teams and countries again after signing for Ekstraklasa side Zagłębie Lubin. On 10 January of the following year, however, he left the club.

Lugo
On 15 November 2022, free agent Pantić joined CD Lugo on a trial basis. On 2 January of the following year, he signed a contract with the club until the end of the season.

International career
Pantić is member of Serbia national under-21 football team since summer 2012. He made his debut on 5 June 2012 against Faroe Islands.

Career statistics

References

External links

1992 births
Living people
People from Aranđelovac
Serbian footballers
Association football defenders
Serbian SuperLiga players
Ukrainian Premier League players
La Liga players
Ekstraklasa players
FK Rad players
Red Star Belgrade footballers
Villarreal CF players
Córdoba CF players
SD Eibar footballers
Deportivo Alavés players
Cádiz CF players
FC Dynamo Kyiv players
Doxa Katokopias FC players
AEL Limassol players
Zagłębie Lubin players
CD Lugo players
Serbia youth international footballers
Serbia under-21 international footballers
Serbian expatriate footballers
Serbian expatriate sportspeople in Spain
Serbian expatriate sportspeople in Ukraine
Serbian expatriate sportspeople in Cyprus
Serbian expatriate sportspeople in Poland
Expatriate footballers in Spain
Expatriate footballers in Ukraine
Expatriate footballers in Cyprus
Expatriate footballers in Poland